Konvergencie is the second album by Collegium Musicum, released on OPUS in 1971.

Track listing - Original LP

LP 1

LP 2

Credits and personnel
 Marián Varga - hammond organ, piano, subharchord, Glockenspiel
 Fedor Frešo - bass guitar, bass mandoline, vocal
 František Griglák - electric guitar, mandoline, vocal
 Dušan Hájek - drums
 Pavol Hammel - lead vocal
 Children's Choir under the direction of I. Klocháň

References

1971 albums
Collegium Musicum (band) albums